Khuzhir is a rural locality (a settlement) in Olkhonsky District of Irkutsk Oblast, Russia, located on the west side of the Olkhon Island, the largest island in Lake Baikal. Population: 

Until June 2014, it had work settlement status.

References

Rural localities in Irkutsk Oblast
Populated places on Lake Baikal
Olkhon Island